Unlimited may refer to:

 Infinity, a boundless or limitless extent or quantity

Arts and entertainment

Games and comics
 Unlimited (Magic: The Gathering), a 1993 core set
 SimCity 3000 Unlimited, a revision of SimCity 3000
 The Unstoppable Wasp: Unlimited, two collected volumes of the comic book series The Unstoppable Wasp

Music
 Unlimited (Bassnectar album), 2016
 Unlimited (F.I.R. album) or the title song, 2005
 Unlimited (Kim Hyun-joong album), 2012
 Unlimited (Miriam Yeung album), 2006
 Unlimited (Reba McEntire album), 1982
 Unlimited (Shizuka Kudo album), 1990
 Unlimited (Shouta Aoi album) or the title song, 2015
 Unlimited (Susperia album), 2004
 Unlimited!, by Roger Troutman, 1987
 Unlimited (EP), by Soul Position, or the title song, 2002
 Unlimited, a recurring leitmotif from the musical Wicked
 "The Unlimited", a song by Sufjan Stevens and Lowell Brams from Aporia, 2020

Television
 Final Fantasy: Unlimited, a 2001–2002 Japanese anime series
 The Millionaire Detective Balance: Unlimited, a 2020 Japanese anime series

Other uses
 Unlimited (arts initiative), a British arts commissioning programme to celebrate the work of disabled and deaf artists
 Unlimited company, a type of corporation in the UK, Ireland, and other countries
 Unlimited Paenga Tawhiti, merged with Discovery 1 to form Ao Tawhiti, a state area school in Christchurch, New Zealand

See also
 Aditi, Sanskrit for "not (a) bound (diti)" or without limits
 Ein Sof, Hebrew for "unending" or without limits
 Adventures Unlimited (disambiguation)
 
 
 Limit (disambiguation)
 Limitless (disambiguation)
 Limited (disambiguation)